May's Folly could mean:
 Hadlow Castle, known locally as May's Folly
 Octagon House (Columbus, Georgia), also known as May's Folly